Giove may refer to:

Giove, Umbria, a town in Italy
GIOVE, Galileo In-Orbit Validation Element, a series of artificial satellites prototyping a satellite navigation system
Missy Giove, American racing cyclist